Gallaher is a surname. Notable people with the surname include:

Carolyn Gallaher, American academic
Dave Gallaher, Irish-born New Zealand rugby union footballer
David Gallaher, American video game writer
Donald Gallaher, American actor
Eddie Gallaher, American radio personality 
Louisa Bernie Gallaher, American scientific photographer
Simon Gallaher, Australian singer and pianist
John Gallaher, American poet